James Ondicho Gesami is a Kenyan politician. He belongs to the Orange Democratic Movement and was elected to represent the West Mugirango Constituency in the National Assembly of Kenya since the 2007 Kenyan parliamentary election. a physician that graduated from at the University of Nairobi. He is also husband to Rachel Mokaya Gesami, who is a well known professor.

References

Living people
Year of birth missing (living people)
Orange Democratic Movement politicians
Members of the National Assembly (Kenya)